The effects of Hurricane Dean in the Lesser Antilles were spread over five island countries and included 3 fatalities. Hurricane Dean of the 2007 Atlantic hurricane season formed in the Atlantic Ocean west of Cape Verde on August 14, 2007. The National Hurricane Center's first Forecast Advisory on the system anticipated that the Cape Verde-type hurricane would pass into the Caribbean through the Lesser Antilles. The storm moved persistently towards the small island chain, strengthening until it passed through the islands three days later on August 17 as a Category 2 hurricane on the Saffir-Simpson Hurricane Scale. It went on to brush the island of Jamaica and reached Category 5 strength before making landfall on Mexico's Yucatán Peninsula.

While crossing the Lesser Antilles, Dean caused moderate damage in St. Lucia, Martinique, and Dominica, where it washed out roads, damaged houses, and killed 6 people. It also devastated the agriculture-dependent economies of those three states, as well as that of Guadeloupe, destroying between 80% and 100% of the banana crops. Deaths were reported as far away as Trinidad.

Preparations 
The National Hurricane Center consistently predicted that the storm would intensify and pass through the islands. As Hurricane Dean approached, the island nations began to prepare with a flurry of activity. On August 14 the Caribbean Disaster Emergency Response Agency (CDERA) placed its Regional Response Mechanism on standby and contacted the National Disaster Coordinators of all member states in the Lesser Antilles. On August 15 the U.S. Agency for International Development (USAID) dispatched teams to Barbados, Dominica, and St. Kitts in advance of the hurricane to provide damage assessment should the hurricane affect those islands. At 11 p.m. AST August 15 (0300 UTC August 16) the respective governments of St. Lucia, Martinique, Saba, St. Eustatius, and Guadeloupe and its dependencies issued Hurricane watches and the government of the Netherlands Antilles issued a tropical storm watch for the island of St. Maarten, as then-Tropical Storm Dean was expected to intensify to hurricane strength and reach the Windward Islands within 36 hours. Authorities in Martinique canceled a memorial to the victims of West Caribbean Airways Flight 708 and began to set up shelters.

At 5 a.m. AST (0900 UTC) August 16 the respective governments of St. Lucia and Dominica issued hurricane warnings in anticipation of Hurricane Dean's imminent approach. In Dominica, a dozen and a half tourists were evacuated to concrete shelters. The government of Dominica also canceled leave for emergency service personnel and evacuated Princess Margret Hospital, fearing that its roof might be vulnerable to the storm's winds. At the same time the Meteorological Service of Barbados issued a tropical storm warning for Barbados and a tropical storm watch for St. Vincent. Three hours later, at 8 a.m. AST (1200 UTC), the Meteorological Service of Antigua issued a tropical storm watch for Montserrat, Antigua, St. Kitts, Nevis and Barbuda. Shortly thereafter the Trinidad and Tobago Meteorological Service issued a tropical storm watch for Grenada and its dependencies.

The Eastern Caribbean Donor Group convened a meeting on August 16 under the Chair of the Resident Representative United Nations Development Programme Barbados in anticipation of the hurricane causing significant damage and member states requiring international assistance. At 11 a.m. AST (1500 UTC) the Barbados Meteorological Service issued tropical storm warnings for St. Vincent and the Grenadines, and the Government of the Netherlands Antilles discontinued the hurricane watch on Saba and St. Eustatius, replacing it with a tropical storm warning. At 5 p.m. AST (2100 UTC) August 16, roughly 15 hours before Hurricane Dean arrived, the Government of France issued hurricane warnings for Martinique and Guadeloupe and its dependencies, and the NHC issued a tropical storm watch for the U.S. Virgin Islands and Puerto Rico. At 8 p.m. AST (2100 UTC) August 16 the Meteorological Service of Antigua issued a tropical storm warning for Anguilla. Martinique's main airport and both of St. Lucia's commercial airports closed that night when the last airplanes landed as the storm's outer rainbands began to sweep over the island. At 11 p.m. AST August 16 (0300 UTC August 17) the NHC upgraded the tropical storm watch on U.S. Virgin Islands to a tropical storm warning. The next morning, August 17, the center of Hurricane Dean passed between St. Lucia and Martinique. The Meteorological Service of Antigua issued a tropical storm warning for the British Virgin Islands that same morning, and the Eastern Caribbean Donor Group convened a second meeting to finalize the coordination of three Rapid Assessment Teams.

Impact 

St. Lucia 

Power outages began in some neighborhoods at 6:30 p.m. AST (2230 UTC) August 16, over 12 hours before the storm arrived, and quickly spread over the entire island. The winds uprooted trees, downed electricity poles, disabled bridges, triggered landslides, and damaged several roofs. Hurricane Dean tore the corrugated metal roof off Victoria Hospital's pediatric ward, but its patients had already been evacuated. St. Jude Hospital in Vieux Fort was also damaged when part of the roof blew off its medical ward and fell through the roof of the emergency room. A section of the cafeteria also lost its roof, but no one was injured in either incident.

The capital, Castries, was flooded by the storm surge and high seas deposited boulders and fishing boats on the streets. One person drowned in Sarrot after being swept away by a rain-swollen river while trying to recover a cow. Flooding was also reported in the town of Dennery where a number of residents had to be evacuated. Nationwide, damage to housing and buildings totaled EC$800,000. In the worst hit areas of the north, closest to Hurricane Dean's path, at least 15 roofs were blown off. Two small waterfront houses were completely destroyed in the town of Gros Islet. The heavy seas also sunk or damaged several boats and damaged coastal roads, in some places eroding the land itself.  Coastal damage was estimated at $700,000.

Although the Ministry of Education reported that eleven schools had sustained a combined total of $300,000 of damage, the Ministry of Communications, Works, Transport, and Public Utilities reported that most of the country's other major infrastructure remained functional. They estimated that the cost to clean up all of the roads and drains was $900,000 and the cost to repair the utilities and communications damage was another $505,000. Saint Lucia Air and Sea Ports Authority reported another $922,000 of damage, but none of these sectors experienced prolonged disruptions to their functionality.

The island's  of banana farms in Mabouya Valley, Roseau Valley, and Marc Marc were severely damaged with many of the plantations waterlogged or outright destroyed. An average of 75% of the crops were lost, with some fields in the Northern Farms losing up to 80% and in the Roseau Valley losing up to 85%. The cost to the agriculture industry was $13.2 million, bringing Hurricane Dean's total cost to $17.3 million (US$6.4 million in 2007) or 0.5% of the nation's GDP.

Martinique 

Martinique experienced 160 km/h winds with gusts to 215 km/h. The torrential rainfall, which reached  caused flooding throughout the island, with the town of Rivière-Pilote flooding completely. The majority of Martinique's population were left without electricity, water, telephone, or food. The storm destroyed Martinique's entire banana crop, and 70% of the island's sugar cane plantations.

Three people were killed, many more were injured, and 600 Martiniquans were left homeless. The banana fields were completely destroyed. Officials estimated the damage on the island at about €250 million (US$337 million).

Dominica 
In Dominica, a mother and her seven-year-old son died when one of a dozen landslide caused by the heavy rains fell onto their house. Landslides also blocked several roads in the mountainous country. In another incident two people were injured when a tree fell on their house.

Prime Minister Roosevelt Skerrit initially estimated that 100 to 125 homes were damaged, but in actuality Hurricane Dean damaged many more: 183 houses lost their roofs completely, 205 houses sustained partial damage to their roofs, 43 houses were completely destroyed, 115 houses suffered significant structural damage to components other than their roofs, and 225 non-dwelling buildings were damaged. In total, 771 buildings suffered significant damage.

Princes Margret Hospital, the island's only hospital, suffered damage to the roofs of the psychiatric and intensive care units. This led to heavy water damage, which also spread into the maternity ward and damaged the electrical system. All of the patients had been evacuated before the storm arrived. Because most equipment and supplies had also been removed, the hurricane's cost to the health sector was limited to the EC$3 million of structural damage.

The storm surge caused EC$15.5 million of damage to sea walls and another EC$15 million of damage to coastal bridges. Floods and landslides contributed EC$17.6 million of damage to the island's road network, while river floods destroyed EC$45.5 million of river walls. Flooding also devastated the agriculture sector and 95% of the crops were lost. Replanting a rehabilitation of the banana trees, 99% of which were destroyed, was expected to take several years.

Guadeloupe 
Overall damage from Dean is fairly minor in Guadeloupe. The country's main exports.

Elsewhere 
Although the winds and rain of the hurricane did not reach as far south as the islands of Trinidad and Tobago, sea swells on the east coast killed two people as they tried to secure a boat.

Aftermath 
St. Lucia and Dominica activated their Caribbean Disaster Emergency Response Agency (CDERA) response systems to help assess and correct the storm's damages. CDERA acknowledged their requests and, based on preliminary damage assessments, initiated a Level Two response which allowed for the event to be managed at the country level with regional assistance limited to technical support and resources where required. Barbados, Saint Vincent and the Grenadines, and Grenada also activated their CDERA response systems. Although they were not directly affected by the hurricane they used the opportunity to test the systems' operating procedures. The other affected islands of the Lesser Antilles, Martinique and Guadeloupe, are not members of CDERA.

CDERA dispatched a technical support team of Bajans, Montserratians, and Grenadians to Dominica on August 22 to assist in developing a damage assessment. The Government of Venezuela sent 500 blankets, 500 sheets, 3 large tents, 120 units of tarpaulin, water, and medical supplies to Dominica. The Government of Canada pledged $2 million in immediate aid to the afflicted countries. The U.S. Government, through the U.S. Agency for International Development (USAID), declared a disaster in Dominica and St. Lucia and provided $25,000 and 75 rolls of plastic sheeting to Dominica for emergency shelter repairs and an additional 50 rolls of plastic sheeting to St. Lucia through its National Emergency Management Organization. CDERA petitioned the Caribbean Development Bank for a US$100,000 relief grant to assist with relief efforts and damage repairs in St. Lucia and Dominica.

Although St. Lucia suffered significant damage to its residential structures and agricultural land, its airports and hotels were operational within days having needed only small-scale repair work. Hospitals and other essential services kept running on standby power supplied by independent generators to assist in the cleanup and recovery efforts. Roads connecting the north and south of the island were quickly cleared. LUCELEC, the nation's only electricity provider, worked around the clock to repair dozens of downed electrical poles and restored electricity by August 21. The rest of the island's infrastructure weathered the storm. Two shelters were opened for hurricane-affected residence, and USAID/OFDA provided US$40,432 of assistance to the island.

Dominican Prime Minister Roosevelt Skerrit declared August 19, 2007 to be a national day of prayer and thanks-giving. The destruction of 546 residences forced approximately 1,000 people into 100 shelters. A USAID disaster specialist liaised with the Dominican Office of Disaster Management and arraigned for assistance to the order of US$60,648 of relief supplies and $25,000 of Emergency Shelter supplies.

In the days after to storm, some residents of Martinique, still without electricity, food, water, or telephones, took to looting stores and bakeries. Utility workers from Guadeloupe, French Guiana, and France arrived on August 19 to help restore electricity.

The Secretary of State for the French Overseas, Christian Estrosi, visited Martinique shortly after the hurricane to inspect the damage. He was joined by French Prime Minister, François Fillon on August 22 and the two surveyed the damaged to Guadeloupe and Martinique, the two hardest hit French colonies. A week after the storm hit 11,000 people in Martinique were still without telephone and electricity and in the worst hit parts of southern Guadeloupe the water was still not drinkable. Banana crops in Guadeloupe, 80% of which were destroyed by Dean, will not recover until March, 2008.

See also 

 2007 Atlantic hurricane season
 Hurricane Dean
 List of Atlantic hurricanes
 List of Category 5 Atlantic hurricanes

References 

Hurricane Dean
2007 in the Caribbean
Dean
Dean Lesser Antilles